Robert Hippolyte Chodat (4 June 1865, Moutier – 28 April 1934) was a Swiss botanist and phycologist who was a professor and director of the botanical institute at the University of Geneva.

He studied medicine and botany at Geneva, where he was later a lecturer of pharmacy. In 1889 he attained the title of associate professor, two years later becoming a full professor of medical and pharmaceutical botany. From 1900 onward, he taught classes in general and systematic botany. In 1908 he was appointed rector at the University of Geneva.

Chodat was a leading authority of the botanical family Polygalaceae. In 1914, with Emil Hassler (1864–1937), he collected plants in Región Oriental of Paraguay. He was made Chevalier de la Légion d'Honneur in 1909. He was winner of the 1933 Linnean Medal.

Selected publications 
 Monographia Polygalacearum, vol.1 1891, vol.2 1893.
 1898–1907 : Plantae Hasslerianae (with Emil Hassler).
 Etude Critique et Experimentale sur le Polymorphisme des Algues, 1909.
 La Végétation du Paraguay. Résultats Scientifiques d'une Mission Botanique Suisse au Paraguay, (with Wilhelm Vischer 1890–1960).
 La biologie des plantes: Les plantes aquatiques, 1917.

References 
 Parts of this article are based on a translation of an equivalent article at the Spanish Wikipedia.
 Robert Chodat, Dictionnaire Historique Suisse (DHS)
 HUH- Index of Botanical Publications

Notes

19th-century Swiss botanists
Swiss pharmacists
Phycologists
Academic staff of the University of Geneva
Members of the French Academy of Sciences
Recipients of the Legion of Honour
Corresponding Members of the USSR Academy of Sciences
1865 births
1934 deaths
20th-century Swiss botanists